Gentbrugge is a third smaller railway station in Ghent, East Flanders, Belgium.  The station opened on 15 June 1861 on the Lines 58 and 59. The train services are operated by NMBS/SNCB.

The current building was built in 1973 by architects Dirk Servaes and Johan Beyne. These are the same architects who designed the railway station of Gent-Dampoort''.

Train services
The station is served by the following services:

Local services (L-05) Eeklo - Ghent - Oudenaarde - Ronse
Local services (L-05) Eeklo - Ghent - Oudenaarde - Kortrijk (weekdays)

References

External links
Belgian Railways website for Gentbrugge

Railway stations in Belgium
Railway stations opened in 1861
1861 establishments in Belgium
Railway stations in East Flanders
Buildings and structures in Ghent